Novastoa lamellosa is a species of sea snail, a marine gastropod mollusc in the family Vermetidae, the worm snails.

References

 Powell A. W. B., New Zealand Mollusca, William Collins Publishers Ltd, Auckland, New Zealand 1979 
 MacNae, W. & M. Kalk (eds) (1958). A natural history of Inhaca Island, Mozambique. Witwatersrand Univ. Press, Johannesburg. I-iv, 163 pp.

Vermetidae
Gastropods described in 1873